Jaylen Morris (born September 19, 1995) is an American professional basketball player who last played for the Austin Spurs of the NBA G League. He played college basketball for Molloy College in the NCAA Division II.

Early life and college career
Morris had previously gone to high school at St. Joseph's Collegiate Institute in Buffalo, New York. During his senior year there, he was an honorable mention for the All-Western New York team and named Mr. Defense for having the best defensive abilities of the state that year. However, with no scholarships from major schools, he decided to go to Molloy College, where his father Patrick is an assistant coach for the basketball team. During his first two years at Molloy College, Morris provided decent numbers for the Lions, with his sophomore season having him be an East Coast Conference All-Conference Honorable Mention. Starting in his junior and senior seasons, Morris would grow into more of a star player for the college, with him being named a member for both the All-ECC Third-team and All-Met Second-team in his junior year, as well as a member of the All-ECC First-team in his senior year of college. During his senior year, he became the second-highest scorer for the team, averaging 19.9 points per game during his senior season.

Professional career

Erie BayHawks (2017–2018)
After going undrafted in the 2017 NBA Draft, Morris would pay $150 to work out with the Long Island Nets. His workout there would lead to him getting drafted by the Erie BayHawks in the 2017 NBA G League Draft in the second round as the 41st overall pick that year.

Atlanta Hawks (2018)
On February 28, 2018, after multiple successful games from Morris with the BayHawks, he signed a 10-day contract with the Atlanta Hawks. Morris made his NBA debut that same day in a 107–102 win over the Indiana Pacers. In his debut, Morris recorded 2 points and 2 rebounds in 11 minutes of action. After his first 10-day contract expired, he signed a second 10-day contract with the Hawks on March 11, 2018. During that night's game, he would end up injuring his ankle, thus sidelining him for up to two weeks. Despite the injury, Morris would ultimately sign with the Hawks for the rest of the season on March 21. He was waived on July 19, 2018.

Milwaukee Bucks (2018–2019)
On July 22, 2018, Morris signed a deal with the Italian club Auxilium Pallacanestro Torino. However, Morris later that week opted out of the contract with Auxilium Pallacanestro Torino in order to sign a two-way contract with the Milwaukee Bucks, which was made official on July 31. On January 13, 2019, the Bucks requested waivers on Morris.

Return to Erie (2019)
On January 31, 2019, the Erie BayHawks announced that they had added Morris to their roster.

Aris (2019–2020)
On September 25, 2019, Aris Thessaloniki announced that Morris had joined their club for the 2019–2020 season. He averaged 9.9 points, 3.8 rebounds and 1.3 assists per game.

Bnei Herzliya (2020)
On October 27, 2020, Morris signed a one-month deal with Bnei Herzliya of the Israeli National League.

Iowa Wolves (2021)
Morris joined the Iowa Wolves of the G League for their 2021 restart. He was waived by the Wolves on February 12 after one game with the team.

Austin Spurs (2021)
Morris was claimed by the Austin Spurs on February 14, 2021. On February 25, he was released following a season-ending injury.

On October 8, 2021, Morris signed with the San Antonio Spurs, but was released prior to the start of the season. On October 27, he re-signed with the Austin Spurs.

San Antonio Spurs (2022)
On January 1, 2022, Morris signed a 10-day contract with the San Antonio Spurs via the hardship exemption.

Return to Austin (2022)
On January 11, 2022, Morris was reacquired by the Austin Spurs.

NBA career statistics

Regular season

|-
| style="text-align:left;"| 
| style="text-align:left;"| Atlanta
| 6 || 0 || 16.4 || .406 || .200 || – || 2.7 || 1.2 || .3 || .2 || 4.7
|-
| style="text-align:left;"| 
| style="text-align:left;"| Milwaukee
| 4 || 0 || 7.1 || .400 || .333 || .500 || 1.3 || 1.0 || .5 || .0 || 2.5
|-
| style="text-align:left;"| 
| style="text-align:left;"| San Antonio
| 3 || 0 || 5.3 || .000 || .000 || .500 || .7 || .7 || .0 || .0 || .7
|- class="sortbottom"
| style="text-align:center;" colspan="2"| Career
| 13 || 0 || 11.0 || .354 || .200 || .500 || 1.8 || 1.0 || .3 || .1 || 3.1

References

External links

Molloy Lions bio
Jaylen Morris NBA G League player profile

1995 births
Living people
21st-century African-American sportspeople
African-American basketball players
American men's basketball players
American expatriate basketball people in Greece
Aris B.C. players
Atlanta Hawks players
Austin Spurs players
Basketball players from New York (state)
Erie BayHawks (2017–2019) players
Iowa Wolves players
Milwaukee Bucks players
Molloy Lions men's basketball players
People from Amherst, New York
San Antonio Spurs players
Shooting guards
Sportspeople from Erie County, New York
St. Joseph's Collegiate Institute alumni
Undrafted National Basketball Association players
Wisconsin Herd players